The Kumbukkan Oya is the twelfth-longest river of Sri Lanka. It runs across two provinces and two districts. 

Its catchment area receives approximately 2,115 million cubic metres of rain per year, and approximately 12 percent of the water reaches the sea. It has a catchment area of 1,218 square kilometres.

References 

Bodies of water of Ampara District
Rivers of Sri Lanka